American Tragedy Redux is the first remix album by American rap rock band Hollywood Undead. It is taking songs from the band's second studio album, American Tragedy, and remixing them. It was released on November 21, 2011, by A&M/Octone Records. The original tracks on the album were recorded following the induction of Daniel Murillo into the band in early 2010 and lasted until December. The tracks were then remixed by various DJs and musicians during the band's World War III Tour with Asking Alexandria later in 2011. The album's first single, "Levitate (Digital Dog Club Mix)", was released on October 18, 2011, with a music video being released on October 24.

Background
Following the release of the band's second studio album, American Tragedy, the band announced a remix contest on August 11, 2011, where fans created their own remixes of the tracks "Le Deux" and "Bullet". The contest winner for the "Le Deux" was Dr. Eargasm, whose remix was chosen by the band and is featured on the album. The "Bullet" remix was voted as the best remix and was included on Redux as an iTunes bonus track. The band announced in October 2011 that a remix album, titled American Tragedy Redux, would be released on November 21, 2011 as their first remix album. The band created a series of online promotions for the album. First, they unlocked the track list and cover art for the album once the album title was tweeted 10,000 times on Twitter, which was accomplished by the end of the second day that the contest started. Then, the band released the first single, "Levitate (Digital Dog club mix)", on October 18 once the album art was shared 3,000 times on Facebook. A music video for "Levitate (Digital Dog club mix)" was released on October 24, 2011 through Virgin Mobile. The last Facebook unlock was a site for pre-ordering the album and ordering merchandise. The band also released the "Comin' In Hot (Wideboys Remix)" on the pre-order site. J-Dog said of the album, "This is our first remix record ever, we got to pick the DJs and re-mixers that the band really likes. Who would have thought that someone you grew up listening to would one day remix your song?"

Da Kurlzz gave an interview with The Phoenix New Times about the album where he states that many of the songs were influenced by older hip-hop and rock music like Nine Inch Nails, Beastie Boys, and Guru. Da Kurlzz felt that the popularity in dance and club music was surging and that inspired the band to create Redux, stating that the band was "paying attention not only to the rock, hip hop and pop scene, but the dance and DJ club scene is obviously blowing up once again. There's always new DJs remixing some really great artists, showing people that you can mix those genres together." Upon deciding which DJs and re-mixers to use for the album, Da Kurlzz stated that the band used decided specifically which of their songs would go best with each artist and how the remixed result would sound. He concluded by saying that they chose the artists, "not just because we like their music, but we also think that the sound will really be great for the certain songs that we choose." Da Kurlzz also stated that the band worked carefully with each artist during the remixing process to ensure the best songs for the album. He stated that the remix of "Hear Me Now" by Jonathan Davis, which was streamed by Revolver Magazine on November 14, was the most difficult but that "it ended up coming out great and we're really proud of it..." and that they were able to "go up to him and personally thank [Davis]."

Charlie Scene stated that the album came around from touring with several bands, like Asking Alexandria and Korn, and seeing their experiments with remixing songs. He added that, "it’s always cool to see [how] another artist interprets your music." When choosing remixers, Charlie Scene said, "Jonathan Davis was one of the people we met on tour and we know that he does remixes and that was actually one of the reasons and one of the ways we came up with the idea to doing a remix record." He noted that the music on the remix album is very different, reasoning this by stating, "There’s only [so] many rock bands that can come out with just guitars and singing over and over again and hardcore screaming... music has to change, it has to evolve with what's going on with society and kids. It's becoming more technical now, it's becoming more digital so I think rock music [is] going to have to become more digital."

Reception

Critical reception
The Daily Blam gave a positive review of the album, noting that the band's sound lent well to remixing and that, "Hollywood Undead have managed to blend rock and hip hop without sounding like trend hoes." The choice in remixers was noted as well as the three opening tracks.

Accolades

Commercial performance
Upon release, American Tragedy Redux charted on the US Hard Rock Albums chart and the Dance/Electronica Albums chart in its first week of release. It charted at number 15 on the Hard Rock and number nine on the Dance/Electronica charts, respectively. The original American Tragedy, which songs Redux remixed, also charted on the US Top Hard Rock Albums chart the same week that Redux debuted. American Tragedy charted at number 14, one spot higher than Redux.

Track listing
All tracks are written and performed by Hollywood Undead, with specific writers detailed for each track. Each track remixed by various artists.

Personnel
Credits for American Tragedy Redux adapted from Allmusic, as well as American Tragedy.

Hollywood Undead
Daniel "Danny" Murillo – vocals, keyboards
Jordon "Charlie Scene" Terrell – vocals, lead guitar
Jorel "J-Dog" Decker – vocals, rhythm guitar, bass guitar, keyboards, synthesizers, programming
George "Johnny 3 Tears" Ragan – vocals
Dylan "Funny Man" Alvarez  – vocals
Matthew "Da Kurlzz" St. Claire – vocals, drums, percussion

Additional personnel

Don Gilmore – production, composer
Griffin Boice – production, engineering, mixing, guitar, bass guitar, drums, percussion, organ, programming, strings
Ben Grosse – production, engineering, mixing, keyboards, programming, composer
Jeff Halavacs – production, guitar
Kevin Rudolf – production, engineering, instrumentation, composer
S*A*M – production, programming, composer
James Diener – A&R
Steve Cornish – production, remixing
Nick Mace – production, remixing
Jim Sullivan – production, remixing

Eddie Craig – production, remixing
Sidh Solanki – production, remixing
Andrew Krier – production, remixing
Beatnick – production, remixing
K-Salaam – production, remixing
Jonathan Davis – production, remixing
Asaf Borger – production, remixing
Dr. Eargasm – production, remixing
Erik Tinajero – production, remixing
David Gill – production, remixing
Joey Jensen – production, remixing
KMFDM – production, remixing
Kay V – production, remixing

Charts

Weekly charts

Release history

External links
Official band website
Dr. Eargasm official website

References

2011 albums
2011 remix albums
Hollywood Undead albums
A&M Records albums